In medicine, a late effect is a condition that appears after the acute phase of an earlier, causal condition has run its course.  A late effect can be caused directly by the earlier condition, or indirectly by the treatment for the earlier condition.  Some late effects can occur decades later.  Historically, late effects have been very difficult to connect with their causes, but as survivorship and life span has increased and "follow up" has become standard practice, these connections are becoming established. A period, often very long, of health unaffected by both the initial and the late effect conditions distinguishes a late effect from a sequela or a complication. A code for such a condition was present in the ICD-9 but is no longer present in the ICD-10.

Examples
 Chickenpox may be followed decades later by herpes zoster:  see herpes zoster
 Chemotherapy, radiation therapy and surgery to cure a cancer may result years later in another, unrelated cancer and infertility or subfertility: see oncofertility
 Female survivors of childhood leukemia treated with cranial radiation therapy may be unable to breastfeed because they do not lactate

See also
 Adverse effect

References

External links
 Late effects of the heart
 General inpatient coding guidelines

Epidemiology